The women's 3000 metre relay competition in short track speed skating at the 2022 Winter Olympics was held on 9 February (semifinals) and 13 February (finals), at the Capital Indoor Stadium in Beijing. The event was won by Suzanne Schulting, Selma Poutsma, Xandra Velzeboer, and Yara van Kerkhof, representing the Netherlands. They set a new Olympic record in Final A. It was the first time a European team won the event. South Korea won silver, and China bronze.

The defending champion were South Korea, with Italy and the Netherlands being second and third in 2018. The Netherlands were the 2021 World Short Track Speed Skating champion, France and Italy are the silver and bronze medalists, respectively. Many top athletes did not participate in the championship, however. The Netherlands were leading the 2021–22 ISU Short Track Speed Skating World Cup with four races completed before the Olympics, followed by South Korea and Canada.

Qualification

The top with the top 8 countries qualified a relay through the 2021–22 ISU Short Track Speed Skating World Cup, including host nation China.

Records
Prior to this competition, the existing world and Olympic records were as follows.

A new Olympic record was set during the competition.

Results

Semifinals

Finals

Final B

Final A

References

Women's short track speed skating at the 2022 Winter Olympics